This article contains an overview of the sport of athletics, including track and field, cross country and road running, in the year 2003.

The foremost competition of the year was the 2003 World Championships in Athletics, followed by the 2003 IAAF World Indoor Championships. At regional level, athletics was featured at two major games that were held that year: the 2003 Pan American Games and the 2003 All-Africa Games.

Major events

World

World Championships in Athletics
World Indoor Championships
World Athletics Final
World Cross Country Championships
World Half Marathon Championships
World Youth Championships
World Student Games
Military World Games
Golden League
World Outdoor Meetings
World Marathon Majors

Regional

All-Africa Games
African Junior Championships
Asian Championships
Asian Cross Country Championships
Central Asian Games
Indian Ocean Island Games
Southeast Asian Games
Central American and Caribbean Championships
Pan American Games
South American Athletics Championships
South American Cross Country Championships
 Balkan Games
European Cross Country Championships
European Cup
European Junior Championships
European U23 Championships
European Mountain Running Championships

World records

Men

Women

Awards

Men

Women

Men's best year performances

400m Hurdles

3,000m Steeplechase

Pole Vault

Hammer Throw

Decathlon

Women's best year performances

100 metres

200 metres

Half Marathon

100m Hurdles

400m Hurdles

3,000m Steeplechase

High Jump

Pole Vault

Hammer Throw

Heptathlon

Marathon

Men's competition

Pan American Games

Best Year Performances

Women's competition

Pan American Games

Best Year Performances

Deaths
 April 22 — Mike Larrabee, American athlete (b. 1933)
 April 25 — Samson Kitur (37), Kenyan middle-distance runner (b. 1966)
 April 28 — Juha Tiainen (47), Finnish hammer thrower (b. 1955)
 September 24 — Benson Masya (33), Kenyan long-distance runner (b. 1970)

References
 ARRS

 
Athletics (track and field) by year